After winning the World Series the previous year, the 1967 Baltimore Orioles plummeted to a sixth-place finish in the American League with a record of 76 wins and 85 losses, 15½ games behind the AL champion Boston Red Sox. The team was managed by Hank Bauer, and played their home games at Memorial Stadium.

Offseason 
 November 28, 1966: Frank Tepedino was drafted from the Orioles by the New York Yankees in the 1966 first-year draft.
 January 28, 1967: 1967 Major League Baseball draft
Lew Beasley was drafted by the Orioles in the 2nd round.
Johnny Oates was drafted by the Orioles in the 1st round (10th pick) of the Secondary Phase.

Regular season 
 On April 30, 1967, Steve Barber threw a no-hitter versus the Detroit Tigers but lost in a 2–1 final. Barber would become the first pitcher in the history of the American League whose no-hit game ended in a loss.
 May 14, 1967: In a game against the Orioles at Yankee Stadium, future Hall of Famer Mickey Mantle of the New York Yankees hit his 500th home run in the bottom of the seventh inning in a 6–5 Yankee win.

Season standings

Record vs. opponents

Opening Day lineup

Notable transactions 
 May 10, 1967: Bob Johnson was purchased from the Orioles by the New York Mets.
 May 29, 1967: Mike Epstein and Frank Bertaina were traded by the Orioles to the Washington Senators for Pete Richert.
 May 31, 1967: Charley Lau was purchased from the Orioles by the Atlanta Braves.
 June 6, 1967: 1967 Major League Baseball draft
Don Baylor was drafted by the Orioles in the 2nd round.
Dave Johnson was drafted by the Orioles in the 5th round.
 June 15, 1967: Woodie Held was traded by the Orioles to the California Angels for Marcelino López and Tom Arruda (minors).
 July 4, 1967: Steve Barber was traded by the Orioles to the New York Yankees for Ray Barker, players to be named later, and cash. The Yankees completed the deal by sending Chet Trail (minors) and Joe Brady (minors) to the Orioles on December 15.
 August 21, 1967: John Buzhardt was purchased by the Orioles from the Chicago White Sox.

Roster

Player stats

Batting

Starters by position 
Note: Pos = Position; G = Games played; AB = At bats; H = Hits; Avg. = Batting average; HR = Home runs; RBI = Runs batted in

Other batters 
Note: G = Games played; AB = At bats; H = Hits; Avg. = Batting average; HR = Home runs; RBI = Runs batted in

Pitching

Starting pitchers 
Note: G = Games pitched; IP = Innings pitched; W = Wins; L = Losses; ERA = Earned run average; SO = Strikeouts

Other pitchers 
Note: G = Games pitched; IP = Innings pitched; W = Wins; L = Losses; ERA = Earned run average; SO = Strikeouts

Relief pitchers 
Note: G = Games pitched; W = Wins; L = Losses; SV = Saves; ERA = Earned run average; SO = Strikeouts

Farm system 

LEAGUE CHAMPIONS: Bluefield

Notes

References 

1967 Baltimore Orioles at Baseball Reference
1967 Baltimore Orioles season at Baseball Almanac

Baltimore Orioles seasons
Baltimore Orioles season
Baltimore Orioles